Part of Me is a song by American singer-songwriter Chris Cornell, from his third solo studio album, Scream. Part of Me is the first official single for Canada and Europe (and second official single overall) and was released as a digital download on October 12, 2008 in Canada and Germany. There is no indication of a release in the US. The non-explicit version of the song was previewed on Virgin Radio 999, where listeners were encouraged to enter a poll of the audience's reaction to the song. The Album version of the song was leaked on the 12th November, where the outro is the seamless integration into the next song "Time", on the "album orientated" Scream. California DJ Steve Aoki also made a remix of the song which can be downloaded for free in MP3 off his record label's official website, while his remix also appears on the official "Part of Me (Remix EP)" digital release.

Background
This song refers to a fictional (or otherwise) incidence in lusting after a girl (and a possible 'fling'): "I want the girl but I want a lot, Might cross my mind but that's where it stops." 
Cornell explains to an established lover that "But I swear it never meant a thing, she was just a fling."

Music video
A music video for this song has been made for Canadian, UK and Ireland release. However, the video is available in other European countries.
Timbaland makes a cameo in the video. The video also features cameo appearances from heavyweight boxing champion Wladimir Klitschko and Wu-Tang Clan rapper Method Man.

Charts

Release history

References

2008 singles
Chris Cornell songs
Timbaland songs
Song recordings produced by Timbaland
Songs written by Timbaland
Songs written by Chris Cornell
Song recordings produced by Jerome "J-Roc" Harmon
Songs written by Jerome "J-Roc" Harmon
Songs written by Balewa Muhammad
Songs written by Ezekiel Lewis
2008 songs
Interscope Records singles